The Nercha (Nershüü; , Nerchüü) is a river in Zabaykalsky Krai in Russia, left tributary of the Shilka (Amur's basin). The Nercha freezes up in October and stays icebound until late April – early May. The town of Nerchinsk is located on the Nercha,  from its confluence with the Shilka.

Notes

References

Rivers of Zabaykalsky Krai